1,8-Bis(dimethylamino)naphthalene is an organic compound with the formula CH(NMe) (Me = methyl). It is classified as a peri-naphthalene, i.e. a 1,8-disubstituted derivative of naphthalene.  Owing to its unusual structure, it exhibits exceptional basicity. It is often referred by the trade name Proton Sponge, a trademark of Sigma-Aldrich.

Structure and properties
This compound is a diamine in which the two dimethylamino groups are attached on the same side (peri position) of a naphthalene ring. This molecule has several very interesting properties; one is its very high basicity; another is its spectroscopic properties.

With a pK of 12.34 for its conjugate acid in aqueous solution, 1,8-bis(dimethylamino)naphthalene is one of the strongest organic bases. However, it only absorbs protons slowly—hence the trade name. The high basicity is attributed to the relief of strain upon protonation and/or the strong interaction between the nitrogen lone pairs. Additionally, although many aromatic amines such as aniline show reduced basicity (due to nitrogen being sp2 hybridized; its lone pair occupying a 2p orbital and interacting and being withdrawn by the aromatic ring), this is not possible in this molecule, as the nitrogens' methyl groups prevent its substituents from adopting a planar geometry, as this would require forcing methyl groups from each nitrogen atom into one another - thus the basicity is not reduced by this factor which is found in other molecules. It is sterically hindered, making it a weak nucleophile. Because of this combination of properties, it has been used in organic synthesis as a highly selective non-nucleophilic base.

Proton sponge also exhibits a very high affinity for boron, and is capable of displacing hydride from borane to form a boronium–borohydride ion pair.

Preparation
This compound is commercially available. It may be prepared by the methylation of 1,8-diaminonaphthalene with iodomethane or dimethyl sulfate.

Related compounds

Other proton sponges
Second generation proton sponges are known with even higher basicity. 1,8-bis(hexamethyltriaminophosphazenyl)naphthalene or HMPN is prepared from 1,8-diaminonaphthalene by reaction with tris(dimethylamino)bromophosphonium bromide in the presence of triethylamine. HMPN has a pK of 29.9 in acetonitrile which is more than 11 orders of magnitude higher than Proton Sponge.

Hydride sponge
The chemical inverse of a proton sponge would be a hydride sponge. This property is exhibited by CH(BMe), which reacts with potassium hydride to afford K[CH(BMe)H].

References

External links
 Roger Alder research page

Naphthylamines
Reagents for organic chemistry
Non-nucleophilic bases
Dimethylamino compounds
Substances discovered in the 1960s